Gender roles in Mesoamerica were complementary in nature, meaning that men and women had separate but equally important roles in society. Evidence also suggests the existence of gender ambiguity and fluidity in pre-Columbian Mesoamerican societies. Gender relations and roles also varied among different Mesoamerican cultures and societies, through time, and depending on social status. Mesoamerica or Meso-America (Spanish: Mesoamérica) is a region and culture area in the Americas, extending approximately from central Mexico to Honduras and Nicaragua, within which a number of pre-Columbian societies flourished before the Spanish colonization of the Americas in the 16th and 17th centuries.

Boys, for example, are given toys to play with that establish their future mascpresenting their future economic roles. The stereotype that women play a minimal role in the family is far from accurate. Although women's roles in agriculture have been underestimated, if it were not for the contributions of women in agriculture, the family would not survive.

With the arrival of the Spanish and their subsequent colonial rule starting in the 16th century, Mesoamerican gender relations could no longer be considered distinct cultural practices. Gender roles and gender relations instead became subject to the practices of Spanish colonial rule and the casta system which racially categorized the Mesoamericans and their indigenous and mixed descendants. However, despite suppression by Spanish colonialization, aspects of pre-Columbian Mesoamerican gender roles have survived in indigenous communities to this day.

Roles

Labor 
Pre-Columbian Mesoamerican arts contains evidence of a gendered division of labor, depicting women engaged in domestic labor such as weaving, childrearing, tending to animals, and giving birth. Weaving was more strongly associated with gender for the Classic Mexica than the Classic Maya, for which it indicated class. Men were depicted with weapons and in positions of religious and political authority. While evidence suggests that farming was seen as a male activity, the gendered divisions of labor may not have been so strict. Analysis of the bones of women revealed evidence of wear patterns strongly associated with the repetitive motion of grinding maize, suggesting women were primarily engaged in that labor. Anthropologists such as Miranda Stockett believe it is likely that men, women, and children all participated in farming and domestic labor to varying degrees.

Women also hold a variety of roles within the family. These range from harvesting the grains and preparing the food for the family, to taking care of the domesticated animals. When examining the role women play in planting and harvesting, one notices that this area still holds some stereotypes with how the women aid their husbands. In some societies women are responsible for sowing and harvesting the crops but are restricted from ploughing. The roles shared between men and women in agriculture in Santa Rosa, Yucatán. Although women are allocated such tasks as sowing, with all its association with fertility, they are rigidly excluded from ploughing. The significance of not allowing women to plough is related to human reproduction. The common belief is that women should not be able to plough because it invades on the male's role in human reproduction. Thus, men are able to carry out all stages of the agriculture cycle, including the planting of the seed, while women—even in their role as head of the household—are sanctioned to rely upon men for particular tasks. The reasoning behind limiting women's roles with production of the crops is directly related to reproduction. Women rely on men for some tasks when planting crops, just as women need the assistance of the men in reproduction.

Aside from producing food, another important task that women carry out is food preparation, which demands the most attention because the women must sit by the hearth for long periods of time. In the role women have in the preparation of maize, after the grains have been harvested, the next step is to process them so the family can consume them. Apart from childbearing and childrearing, one of the women's foremost duties was the processing of dried corn into maize flour. After being boiled with lime, softened maize kernels were ground with a tubular hand stone on a flat grinding stone (metate) into maize dough. Once the dough is formed, a variety of food items can be made. Here the metate plays an important role in the processing of maize, the staple crop of the culture.

Women play an important role in the survival of their families because the family survives from the work they perform in the corral.

Additionally, the success of Mesoamerican rituals was dependent on the production of food and textiles, to which women contributed much labor. These rituals were vital to ensuring good relationships with not only the gods but also within communities. In Relación de las cosas de Yucatán, Diego de Landa observed that for nearly all rituals, Mayan women were responsible for preparing food for both offerings and consumption in addition to cloth as offerings.

Gender relations among the Mexica also suggested gender complementarity. For example, dying in battle and dying in childbirth elevated men and women respectively. In childbirth, women confront the goddess Cihuacoatl, and if they died, their bodies were considered temporarily imbued with the power of the goddess. Since parts of their bodies could be used as a protective amulet or to curse others, the husband kept vigil by her body for four nights.

In regards to specific Mesoamerican midwives, Aztec midwives were known as the tlamatlquicitl. These midwives provided unique ways of giving birth which involved medical assistance, analgesics or pain relief medications, and religious rituals. For pregnant Aztec women, their part of the pregnancy included some kind of ritual and was also defined by the hygiene they had. Most midwives, including Mayan ones, were actually all similar when it came to focusing on childbirth.

Men in Mesoamerica 
The obvious depiction of men in earlier years all over the world is that they manage everything within a civilization other than being the domestic ones. Similar to that said representation, they are in charge of fighting, hunting, and managing councils of their civilization. It depended on their hierarchy that these men were in established social positions. They had specific jobs within that hierarchy. From being commoners to farmers to government officials, their status' gave them access to certain resources. For example, middle-class Aztec men were mostly farmers who essentially provided all crops such as maize and beans. The artisans in the empire were admired quite often by others. When at the bottom of the hierarchy, a commoner, working on building temples and structures was often given to them.

Politics 
Some Mesoamerican women were able to assume roles as political leaders, such as women in Maya society, others such as women in Mexica society were not. However while Mexica women couldn't serve in this capacity, they were given equal legal and economy rights and noble Mexica women could become priestesses. Additionally, two influential political figures headed the highest levels of Mexica government. One was the tlatoani, literally "the one who speaks", and another was the cihuacoatl, literally "woman snake", both representing a male/female pair. The tlatoani was responsible for military affairs and the cihuacoatl was responsible for domestic affairs like the food supply and administering justice. The position of cihuacoatl was in reality occupied by a man, but the associations with femininity were significant enough that the cihuacoatl, of the same name as the goddess, wore women's dress for ceremonies. As Mesoamerican states became more centralized over time, men's power became more associated with their control over women and their capacity for productive and reproductive labor. As a result, opportunities available to women were gradually limited. In the case of the Mexica, military concerns may have eclipsed women's public significance.

Gender ambiguity 
Although pre-Columbian Mesoamerican art contained depictions of the body as male or female as represented by genitalia or secondary sex characteristics, it also included representations of bodies with exposed chests and waists but no visible sexual characteristics. Depictions of rituals conducted by elite Mesoamericans have included women dressed in the traditional costume of men and men dressed in the traditional costume of women. Classic Maya text also includes situations where gender is not linguistically marked or where gender is marked linguistically as male for a speaker who appears to be a woman or vice versa. This evidence suggests considerable fluidity between the genders in pre-Columbian Mesoamerican society.

See also 

 Mesoamerica
 Gender in Maya society
 Women rulers in Maya society

Notes

Bibliography 

 
 

Mesoamerican society
Mesoamerica